is a city located in Gifu, Japan.

Geography
Nakatsugawa is in the Tōnō region of far eastern Gifu Prefecture, bordering on Nagano Prefecture. The Kiso River and the Agi River flow through the city.

Climate
The city has a climate characterized by hot and humid summers, and mild winters (Köppen climate classification Cfa).

Neighbouring municipalities
Gifu Prefecture
Ena
Gero
Shirakawa
Higashishirakawa
Nagano Prefecture
Kiso
Ōtaki
Ōkuwa
Achi
Hiraya

Demographics
Per Japanese census data, the population of Nakatsugawa peaked around the year 2000 and has declined since.

History
The area around Nakatsugawa was part of traditional Mino Province.  During the Edo period, much of the area was under the  control of Owari Domain, Naegi Domain and Iwamura Domain, or was tenryō under direction control of the Tokugawa shogunate. Nakatsugawa-juku prospered as one of the 69 Stations of the Nakasendō along the Nakasendō highway connecting Edo with Kyoto.  In the post-Meiji restoration cadastral reforms, Ena District in Gifu prefecture was created, and Nakatsugawa was proclaimed a town per the April 1, 1897 establishment of the modern municipalities system. Nakatsugawa merged with the town of Naegi in 1951 and was elevated to city status on April 1, 1952. Nakatsugawa annexed the village of Nakamoto in 1954, Ochiai in 1956, and Agi in 1957. On February 13, 2005, the towns of Tsukechi, Fukuoka and Sakashita and the villages of Hirukawa, Kashimo and Kawaue (all from the former Ena District), and the village of Yamaguchi (from Kiso District, Nagano Prefecture) were merged into Nakatsugawa.

Government
Nakatsugawa has a mayor-council form of government with a directly elected mayor and a unicameral city legislature of 24 members.

Education

Colleges and universities
Chukyo Gakuin University
Nagoya University - Nakatsugawa campus

Primary and secondary education
Nakatsugawa has 19 public elementary schools and 12 public middle schools operated by the city government. The city has four public high schools operated by the Gifu Prefectural Board of Education, and one public high school operated by the city government.

Transportation

Railway
 - JR Central - Chūō Main Line
   -  -  -  
 Akechi Railway (Akechi Line)
  -

Highway
 Chūō Expressway

Sister city relations
 - Registro, São Paulo, Brazil, since 1980

Domestic 

  - Ōiso, Kanagawa, since 1973
  - Komoro, Nagano, since 1973

Local attractions
Kurikinton - Nakatsugawa is known for its abundant chestnut harvest and the chestnut delicacy known as kurikinton (栗きんとん). Kurikinton is produced by boiling and mashing the chestnuts, then mixing them with sugar and reforming into a chestnut shape. It is widely available during the autumn months. Many families make their own, while purchased kurikinton is popular as well for home consumption and as gifts.
Takamine Co., a Japanese guitar manufacturer known for its steel-string acoustic guitars is headquartered in Nakatsugawa.
Misaka Pass, a National Historic Site

Notable people from Nakatsugawa
Seison Maeda, Nihonga painter
Junji Ito, horror mangaka

References

External links

  

 
Cities in Gifu Prefecture